Pietro Accardi (born 12 September 1982) is an Italian former professional footballer who works as the sporting director of Empoli. His usual position was at left-back but he could also play at centre-back.

Playing career

Palermo
Born in Palermo, Sicily, Accardi started his senior career with Serie C1 side Marsala. In 2000, he left for Franco Sensi's Palermo and played two seasons in its youth teams. In although Maurizio Zamparini took over the club in 2002 and bought several players from Venezia his previously own, Accardi secured a place in starting line-up at the start of 2002–03 Serie B season and won promotion to Serie A in 2004.

He also received several call-up from Italy U21 Serie B team for training sessions from 2002 to 2004. He was pulled out from squad by injury before the match against Belgium U21.

In 2004–05 Serie A season, the club signed Fabio Grosso and Accardi worked as the understudy of Grosso.

Sampdoria
In 2006–07 Serie A season, Palermo sold both Grosso and Accardi. Accardi (€2 million), along with midfielder Massimo Bonanni (50% for €2 million) and centre-back Christian Terlizzi (50% for €1.5 million) moved to Sampdoria, which as the piece-weight to sign midfielder Aimo Diana (€5 million) and left-back Marco Pisano (€4 million).

Accardi immediately became one of the starting XI for the Genoa based club. He was injured in the 2007–08 UEFA Cup 2nd qualifying round. whin ruled him out until November.

In the 2009–10 Serie A season he lost his place in starting line-up to Reto Ziegler.

After the club's relegation to Serie B and the departure of Ziegler, he re-took the starting place.

Empoli
On 22 September 2012, he joined Empoli until summer 2013.

Post-playing career
In 2014, Accardi was appointed as the team manager of Empoli. Two years later, he was promoted as the club's new sporting director.

Honours
Palermo
Serie B: 2003–04

Sampdoria
UEFA Intertoto Cup: 2007

References

External links
 Football.it Profile    
 
 La Gazzetta dello Sport Profile (2005–06)  
 La Gazzetta dello Sport Profile (2006–07)  
 La Gazzetta dello Sport Profile (2007–08)  
 La Gazzetta dello Sport Profile  
 

Living people
1982 births
Footballers from Palermo
Association football fullbacks
Italian footballers
Serie A players
Serie B players
Palermo F.C. players
U.C. Sampdoria players
Brescia Calcio players
Empoli F.C. players